Izmir Atatürk organized industrial zone (IAOIZ) is one of the largest and most modern organized industrial zones in Turkey. It started operating in 1990. The Zone is located to the northwest of İzmir, in Cigli district. It is located in the city metropolis, 25 km from the city government complex, 35 km from Adnan Menderes Airport and 20 km from Alsancak Harbor.

The Zone’s total area is 7,500,000m². There are 485 factories where 30,000 people are employed. Two hundred companies are exporters and there are 15 companies of direct foreign investment. In 2 years' time, the number of companies in the Zone will reach about 600 and the number of employees about 50,000.

Companies
The companies in the Zone are mainly active in machinery, textile, ready-made garments, food, plastics, chemicals, metal, automotive-related industry, electrical and electronics sectors.  The annual turnover of the Zone is approximately 4 billion, the export is 2 billion and the import is around 1 million (figures in U.S. Dollars).

Energy
Companies started using natural gas in November 2004. TAER power plant was founded in 1996 in order to meet the continuous and high quality energy needs of the companies in the Zone. The capacity of the plant is 60 megawatts. The electricity consumption is increasing related to the development in the Zone. Having been operated with naphtha until August 2003, the power plant is now producing electricity with natural gas.

Waste water  treatment
A waste water  treatment plant with a full computerized system has been operating at World standards, with a capacity of 21,000m³ / day.

Information service
SMEs Information, Service, Development Center (KOBIM) was established in 2003 in IAOIZ in order to inform and guide the resident SMEs in the Zone to benefit from the privileges and opportunities in foreign trade, investments, research & development supports, incentives and e-commerce. This application is the first one in Turkey.

Innovation relay center
IRC (Innovation Relay Center) project was commenced in April 2004 for the purpose of determining the technology level of SMEs in the zone, finding new technologies they need and conveying them, finding markets for the new technologies that SMEs produce, and encouraging them to participate in R&D projects. This project will last for 4 years and has a budget of 800,000 Euros, of which 50% is funded by the EU, and the other 50% by EBILTEM (Ege University Science-Technology Application and Research Center), EBSO (Aegean Region Chamber of Industry), IAOIZ (Izmir Atatürk Organized Industrial Zone), and KOSGEB (Small and Medium Industry Development Organization).

Information technology
A service agreement was signed between IAOIZ and a private internet service provider in 2004 to bring an end to the problems experienced in ADSL (asymmetric) internet lines acquired by Türk Telekom and to provide a faster, continuous and lower-priced internet access, cheaper telephone services on internet, more than one e-mail address per company and  constant e-mail service.

Providing and conducting the information about the companies in the Zone and their sectors to the industrialists of the region are the principal missions of IAOIZ Management, besides electricity, water and natural gas distribution, providing of construction and building usage licenses, waste collection, waste water treatment, environmental protection, forestation, road construction and maintenance and security services.

Permanent exhibition center
Increasing the trade volume, especially exports, of the Zone is of importance. For this reason a "Permanent Exhibition Center" was established in order to display the companies and the products produced in the Zone. It opened its doors in August 2004 and the products of 150 companies are exhibited in an 800 m² area.

Medical center
Established with the financial support of IAOIZ, there is a modern, fully equipped Social Security Institution Medical Center which serves 24 hours with 11 doctors. In the Medical Centre, all sorts of medical tests are done and the results are obtained on the same day. Furthermore, there is a fully equipped ambulance that serves 365 days / 24 hours with a doctor, a nurse and a driver and its costs are covered by the Zone.

Search and rescue team
There is a "Search and Rescue Team" that consists of 24 people trained by disaster experts. It is ready for national or international disasters. The team has the NIBRA certificate that is valid in the European Union.

Recruitment
To fulfill the qualified employee needs of the resident companies, IAOIZ Private Employment Agency serves free of charge. CVs, education levels, knowledge and experience of job applicants are recorded in detail and are directed to demanding companies.

Scholarships
Apart from all these services, IAOIZ, as an institution which has always been aware of its social responsibilities, grants scholarships to 125 students every year.

References

External links
http://www.iaosb.org.tr

İzmir
Economy of İzmir
Turkish industries